Epipristis storthophora is a moth of the family Geometridae first described by Louis Beethoven Prout in 1937. It is found on Bali in Indonesia.

References

Pseudoterpnini
Moths described in 1937
Taxa named by Louis Beethoven Prout